Henry Clay's Law Office was the law office of American statesman Henry Clay in Lexington, Kentucky from 1803 to 1810; it is one of the few professional buildings still standing from that time.

Clay's law office
Clay received formal legal education at the College of William and Mary in Virginia, studying under George Wythe.
Clay prepared for the bar by working with the Virginia attorney general, Robert Brooke, and he was admitted in 1797. 
As a young lawyer seeking to establish a successful law practice, Clay relocated to Lexington in November 1797. In 1803, Clay  built and occupied the building located on Mill Street near his wife's family residence. The one-story brick structure measures a mere 20 by 22 feet. Clay occupied the office while serving in the Kentucky Legislature and in the United States Senate.

After Clay
In 1830, the law office was incorporated into a larger building, and the original roof was removed.

The State of Kentucky purchased the building in 1969, and restoration was completed in 1971. The law office is now owned by the First Presbyterian Church.

See also 
 Ashland (Henry Clay estate)
 Dr. Henry Clay House
 National Register of Historic Places listings in Fayette County, Kentucky

References

External links

Henry Clay's Law Office web site

:

Henry Clay
Office buildings in Lexington, Kentucky
National Register of Historic Places in Lexington, Kentucky
Commercial buildings on the National Register of Historic Places in Kentucky
Office buildings on the National Register of Historic Places
1803 establishments in Kentucky
Commercial buildings completed in 1803
Legal history of Kentucky
Law offices